Lidia Peralta García (born 1970) is a Spanish journalist and filmmaker.
 
Lidia Peralta García was born in Granada, Spain in 1970.
For several years she studied translation and interpretation, then spent several years travelling in the Middle East, Asia and Africa.
In 2000, she obtained a degree in Journalism from the faculty of Sciences de la Communication of Malaga.
From 2001 she has been a writer and host of the TV show "Tesis", shown on Channel 2 in Andalusia.
This is based on socio-cultural programs of the Andalusian public university.

Her 2007 documentary La Caravana del manuscrito andalusí (The caravan of the manuscripts from Al-Andalus) won the Best Documentary Film prize at the 10th International Panorama of Independent Films.
It was also nominated for Best Documentary Film at the 2008 Marbella International Film Festival.
Her film A House Of Bernarda Alba was selected for the 8th Aljazeera International Documentary Film Festival.

Filmography

References

Living people
1970 births